Nathaniel Lawrence (July 11, 1761 – July 15, 1797) was an American lawyer and politician.

Life
He was the son of Thomas Lawrence (1733—1816; brother of Jonathan Lawrence) and Elizabeth (Fish) Lawrence. He attended Princeton College, but left to fight in the American Revolutionary War as a lieutenant.
In 1788, he was a delegate to the New York State Convention which ratified the U.S. Constitution. He was Secretary to the Board of Regents of the University of the State of New York from 1790 to 1794. He was a member of the New York State Assembly in 1791, 1792, 1795 and 1796. He was New York State Attorney General from 1792 to 1795.

He was a member of the New York Society Library, which has records of books he borrowed in 1791 and 1792.

On February 16, 1796, he was appointed Assistant Attorney General for the First District, comprising Suffolk, Queens, Kings, Richmond and Westchester Counties, and died in office.

He married Elizabeth Berrien (1762–1800; aunt of John M. Berrien), and they had two daughters: Margaret Elizabeth Lawrence who married Philip Lindsley, and Elizabeth Lawrence who died in infancy.

References

Sources
“Nathaniel Lawrence” (class of 1783), Princetonians, 1776-1783 (Princeton: Princeton University Press, 1981), 425-29, 433.
History of Queens County
Nathaniel Lawrence at Haley Lawrence genealogy [gives July 15 as death date]
Google Books The New York Civil List compiled by Franklin Benjamin Hough (Weed, Parsons and Co., 1858; pages 36, 166, 169 and 287)
History of Long Island by Benjamin Franklin Thompson (New York City, 1839; page 426)
Death notice, original from the New York Journal, republished in Queens County in Olden Times by Henry Onderdonk Jr. (Jamaica, NY, 1865; page 87) [gives July 5 as death date]

1761 births
1797 deaths
People from Hempstead (village), New York
New York State Attorneys General
Queens County (New York) District Attorneys
Members of the New York State Assembly
Princeton University alumni
People from Elmhurst, Queens
18th-century American politicians